Major Hockey League may refer to:

Allan Cup Hockey, formerly known as Major League Hockey
Major Hockey League, an ice hockey league in Russia